The Roman Catholic Diocese of Chapecó is a diocese located in the city of Chapecó in the Ecclesiastical province of Florianópolis in Brazil.

History
 January 14, 1958: Established as Diocese of Chapecó from the Diocese of Lages and Metropolitan Archdiocese of Palmas

Leadership
 Bishops of Chapecó (Roman rite), in reverse chronological order
 Bishop Odelir José Magri, MCCI (2014.12.03 – ... )
 Bishop Manoel João Francisco (1998.10.28 – 2014.03.26)
 Bishop José Gomes (1968.07.16 – 1998.10.28)
 Bishop Wilson Laus Schmidt (1962.05.18 – 1968.01.22)
 Bishop José Thurler (1959.02.12 – 1962.03.22)

References
 GCatholic.org
 Catholic Hierarchy
 Diocese website (Portuguese)

Roman Catholic dioceses in Brazil
Christian organizations established in 1958
Chapeco, Roman Catholic Diocese of
Roman Catholic dioceses and prelatures established in the 20th century
1958 establishments in Brazil